Naybin (also Romanized as Nāybīn) is a village in Torkaman Rural District, in the Central District of Urmia County, West Azerbaijan Province, Iran. At the 2006 census, its population was 422, in 109 families.

References 

Populated places in Urmia County